Drupada (Sanskrit: द्रुपद,  lit. firm-footed or pillar), also known as Yajnasena (Sanskrit: यज्ञसेन, lit. he whose army is sacrificial), is a king mentioned in the Hindu epic Mahabharata. He was the ruler of the southern part of Panchala Kingdom, and is famous as the father of Draupadi, the epic's heroine. In the Kurukshetra War, Drupada fought from the side of his son-in-law, the Pandavas, and was killed by his childhood friend and rival, Drona.

Early life and family
According to the Mahabharata, Drupada is the son of Prishata, the king of Panchala Kingdom and his birth name was Yajnasena. Some Puranic scriptures provide a contradictory genealogy, according to which Drupada is the son of Somaka and Prishata is Somaka’s great grandfather.

Drupada's early life is narrated in the Adi Parva of the epic, according to which he goes to the hermitage of the sage Bharadvaja for education and befriends Drona, his classmate and Bhardwaja's son. Drupada assures Drona that once he becomes the king, he would share half of his kingdom with Drona. After completing his education, Drupada returns to Panchala.

The wife of Drupada is addressed as Prishati (lit. 'daughter-in-law of Prishata') in the Mahabharata. The epic also records Drupada praying to the god Shiva, after which Shikhandi—the reincarnation of princess Amba—is born. Different versions of the Mahabharata portray Drupada's family uniquely. In most versions, Shikhandi and Satyajita are the biological children of Drupada, while Dhristadyumna and Draupadi are born from a fire sacrifice organised by him. (See #Kingship for details) In some versions, Uttamaujas and Yudhamanyu, the two princes who protected  the hero Arjuna during the Kurukshetra War, are mentioned as two other sons of Drupada. The Chaturdhara compilation mentions that Drupada has eleven sons, naming in addition to the aforementioned children: Kumara, Vrika, Panchalya, Suratha, Shatrunjaya and Janmejaya.

Kingship
Drupada becomes the king of Panchala after the death of Prishata. According to the Adi Parva of the epic, his capital was known as Kampilya. Meanwhile, Drona lives a life of poverty but after his son, Ashvatthama, is teased for being so poor that he is unable to afford milk, he approaches Drupada for help. Drupada, now conscious of the difference of status between them, refuses to acknowledge their friendship and shuns Drona, and calls him a beggar.

Drona becomes infuriated and vows to avenge the insult. After leaving the palace, he wanders about in search of disciples who are capable of confronting Drupada. He is later employed by Bhishma to train the Kuru princes—the Pandava brothers and the Kaurava brothers. After their military education ends, Drona asks them to defeat and capture Drupada as his gurudakshina (fees). The princes attack Drupada, but the latter is able to defeat all the Kauravas. Then the Pandavas, led by Arjuna, capture Drupada, binding him in ropes and bringing him to Drona. Upon Drupada's request, Drona agrees to maintain friendly relations in future. He is set free, but the country of Panchala is divided into two parts, giving its one part to Drupada, and the another part to Drona.

Though both the kingdoms are on friendly terms, Drupada doesn't forget his insult at the hands of Drona. Realising that neither he nor his children are capable enough to defeat Drona, Drupada desires to have a son powerful enough to take revenge on Drona. He consults several seers and eventually approaches Yaja and Upayaja, two sage brothers, to help him obtain a powerful son. Initially they refuse, but after Drupada serves them for a year, they agree to perform a  yajna (fire-sacrifice). After its completion, they instruct Prishati—the wife of Drupada—to consume the sacrificial offering, but she refuses as she had saffron paste in her mouth and asks them to wait till she washed herself. Criticising her untimely request, Yaja pours the offering into the altar of the sacrifice. A boy and a girl emerge from it, who accept Drupada and Prishati as their parents. They are named Dhrishtadyumna and Krishnā (Draupadi) respectively, and their birth is followed by divine prophecy that Dhrishtadyumna would kill Drona and Draupadi would bring the end of the Kauravas.

Svayamvara of Draupadi 

Drupada, being earlier defeated by Arjuna, is greatly impressed by his skills and intends to wed him to Draupadi. However, at this time the Pandavas are thought to be dead after the burning of Lakshagraha, so he arranges a svayamvara (self-choice ceremony) for Draupadi to choose her husband. To win Draupadi's hand, the participants have to string an enormous bow and shoot an arrow through the eye of a revolving fish while looking into its reflection in the water. All the kings including Shalya, Jarasandha, Karna, and Duryodhana fail to even string the bow. The Pandavas, disguised as brahmins, are present at the svayamvara and with no other prince left to participate, Arjuna completes the task. With Arjuna's identity unknown to him, Drupada  reluctantly gives his permission, but is attacked by other kings for humiliating them by giving Draupadi to a brahmin. Arjuna then saves him and takes Draupadi with him. When the brothers and Draupadi  are about to greet their mother Kunti, they decide to play a prank on her by announcing that they had brought some alms. Kunti asks her sons to share whatever had been brought. The imperative of acting on their mother's words and the propriety of marriage to five husbands is discussed at Drupada's palace, with Drupada and Dhristadyumna fiercely opposed to Draupadi marrying anyone other than Arjuna. However, sage Vyasa and Lord Krishna support Kunti's proposal and sanction the marriage, assuaging Drupada's fears.

Role in Kurukshetra War 
Drupada fights on the side of the Pandavas in the Kurukshetra War. Bhishma names him a Maharathi. On the first day, he fights Jayadaratha. After a long drawn duel, Drupada is finally defeated and flees. During the night of the 14th day, he is defeated by Vrishasena and is rendered unconscious. After he is taken away, Vrihasena massacres most of his army as well. He along with Virata fought and were killed by Drona on the 15th day of the war. He was badly injured and killed by Drona after a long sword fight. After his death, Drona salutes his body saying with tears in his eyes that he had to kill his friend.

References 

Characters in the Mahabharata